Assétou Diakité (born 15 February 1998) is a Malian basketball player for Stade Malien and the Malian national team.

She represented Mali at the 2019 Women's Afrobasket.

References

External links

1998 births
Living people
Centers (basketball)
Malian women's basketball players
Sportspeople from Bamako
21st-century Malian people